A camera stabilizer, or camera–stabilizing mount, is a device designed to hold a camera in a manner that prevents or compensates for unwanted camera movement, such as "camera shake".

For small hand-held cameras, a harness or contoured frame steadies the camera against the photographer's body. In some models, the camera mount is on an arm that protrudes in front of the photographer; beneath the camera is a handle grip. Another variation positions the camera atop a fulcrum brace against the photographer's chest or abdomen.

To compensate for camera instability caused by the movement of the operator's body, camera operator Garrett Brown invented the Steadicam, a body-mounted stabilization apparatus for motion picture cameras, which uses springs as shock absorbers.

In 1991, Martin Philip Stevens (born in England in 1963) invented a hand-held camera stabilizer for motion-picture and video cameras, called the Glidecam. 

Some camera stabilization machines use gyroscopes to sense disruptive motion.  The Artemis Trinity system from Arri combines a mechanical and electronic stabilization.

Since approx. 2015, it is common to stabilize moving cameras with remote controlled camera heads. The camera and lens are mounted in a remote controlled camera holder which is then mounted on a moving dolly, such as rail systems, cable suspended dollys, cars or helicopters. For example the Newton stabilized remote head is broadly used to stabilize moving TV cameras at live broadcast of sports and events.

Although a tripod can hold a camera stably, stationary platforms are not regarded as camera stabilizers.

Camera shoulder brace
A camera shoulder brace stabilizes by shifting the weight of the camera to the operator's shoulder. This allows for smoother shots than might be obtainable by handheld operation. Camera shoulder braces are typically padded for comfort and allow the attachment of zoom controllers, transmitters, and other devices.

The operator generally holds two handles while a third brace rests on the shoulder. A remote LANC zoom controller is usually placed on one of the handles.

Most braces are made of PVC, carbon fiber or light-weight metals to keep the weight down.  If the brace were too heavy it would defeat the purpose of using it, reduced camera shake and fluidity of movement.

For low shots, most braces can be used as a mini-tripod by setting the brace on flat surface.

Shoulder braces also reduce stress on the arms which reduces tiredness and muscle cramps during filming.

See also
 Image stabilization

References

 

Cinematography
Film and video technology
Photography equipment
Articles containing video clips